Anckermann is a surname. Notable people with the surname include:

Carlos Anckermann (1829–1909), Cuban musician, composer, and teacher
Jorge Anckermann (1877–1941), Cuban pianist, composer, and bandleader, son of Carlos

See also
Ackermann (disambiguation)